The My Little Pony franchise debuted in 1982, as the creation of American illustrator and designer Bonnie Zacherle. Together with sculptor Charles Muenchinger and manager Steve D'Aguanno, Zacherle submitted a design patent in August 1981 for "an ornamental design for a toy animal". She was then working for Hasbro. The patent was granted in August 1983.

Main pony line

Earth ponies

Pegasus ponies
Pegasus ponies all have wings, and demonstrate great speed both in the air and on foot. Some are described to be graceful. They are seen manipulating the weather in several occasions such as moving clouds to either cause a storm or clear the skies. They are known to live in a magical island known as Butterfly Island in Generation 3 and in city of clouds, known as Cloudsdale, in Generation 4.

Unicorn ponies
Unicorn ponies are ponies who have a single horn protruding from their forehead, which glows when their powers are used. While they each possess individualized/different magical capabilities, all unicorns share the ability to teleport in a process referred to as "winking". Their teleportation is limited to their line of sight, and can only be performed through open air; any physical obstruction will prevent them from moving through it. Despite being associated with their magic, a unicorn's horn is strong and sharp enough to have mundane uses. They have beautiful horns which helps them use magic.

Friendship Garden Ponies included Copper Glow, Silver Glow, Golden Glow, and Diamond Glow. They all had attachable wings to become winged unicorns.

{| class="wikitable mw-collapsible sortable" cellpadding="10"
|-
!style="background:#6603AA; color: #fff;"|Name
!style="background:#6603AA; color: #fff;"|Gender
!style="background:#6603AA; color: #fff;"|Body color
!style="background:#6603AA; color: #fff;"|Hair color
!style="background:#6603AA; color: #fff;"|Eye color
!style="background:#6603AA; color: #fff;"|Magic aura color
!style="background:#6603AA; color: #fff;"|Cutie mark
!style="background:#6603AA; color: #fff;"|Debut year
!style="background:#6603AA; color: #fff;"|Animation debut
!style="background:#6603AA; color: #fff;"|Voice actor
!style="background:#6603AA; color: #fff;"|Generation(s)
|-
|Alphabittle Blossomforth
|Male
|Gray
|White
|Purple
|Unknown
|A teal teapot
|2021
|My Little Pony: A New Generation
|Phil LaMarr
|5
|-
|style="border-bottom: 3px solid #6603AA;" colspan="14"|Alphabittle Blossomforth is a unicorn who owns the Crystal Tea Shop in Bridlewood. A gambler and expert at games, he has won many of other ponies' possessions, including the Unicorn Crystal, which the protagonists require to restore magic. Disguised as a unicorn, Sunny approaches Alphabittle to win the Unicorn Crystal, but wagers the Pegasus Crystal for it. After three rounds of Just Prance, a dancing game, Sunny emerges victorious, but loses her disguise in the process. Alphabittle insists that he won by default for being tricked, but the protagonists run away with the Unicorn Crystal. After encountering them again, and after a confrontation with the pegasi, everyone learns that no one has magic. During the final confrontation with all ponies present, Alphabittle saves his armadillo friends, but gets stuck, and is saved from being hit by Sprout's war machine by Queen Haven. As the de facto leader of the unicorns, Alphabittle joins the pegasi and earth ponies at the end to become friends again.
|-
|Brights Brightly
|Female
|Yellow
|Orange and pink
|Blue
|Gold
|Rising sun over stylized water and three pink hearts flying over the sun
|2006
|Crystal Princess: The Runaway Rainbow
|Maryke Hendrikse
|3
|-
|style="border-bottom: 3px solid #6603AA;" colspan="14"|Brights Brightly is one of Cheerilee's friends, who alongside Whistle Wishes and Rarity was in charge of bringing in the first rainbow of the season until Rarity disappeared.
|-
|Buttons/Baby Buttons
|Female
|Lilac
|Blue with a red streak
|Blue
|Unknown
|Red buttons (Buttons)Two red buttons and blue stars (Baby Buttons) 
|1985
|My Little Pony: The Movie
|Sheryl Bernstein (My Little Pony: The Movie)Susan Blu (My Little Pony series)
|1
|-
|style="border-bottom: 3px solid #6603AA;" colspan="14"|Buttons loves to decorate her dresses with beautiful buttons. One night, when all the ponies were asleep, she decorated Ponyland with a basket of buttons. In the morning, the ponies looked outside their windows and were delighted to see buttons glittering in fluffy clouds and twinkling in trees. Buttons wove buttons in their hair to finish her unusual decorations. She is telekinetic with her magic and is sometimes bossy. Her daughter is Baby Buttons, who is also telekinetic.
|-
|Cinnamon Chai
|Female
|Peach
|Light brown with light brunette streaks
|Dark purple
|Unknown
|Cinnamon stick in a bowl of cake batter
|2015
|"Rarity Investigates"
|Nicole Oliver
|4
|-
|style="border-bottom: 3px solid #6603AA;" colspan="14"|Cinnamon Chai is the owner of Canterlot's tea and cake shop. She has an Australian accent.
|-
|Coriander Cumin
|Male
|Amber
|Purplish brunette
|Purple
|Purple
|A bowl of rice
|2016
|"Spice Up Your Life"
|Lee Tockar
|4
|-
|style="border-bottom: 3px solid #6603AA;" colspan="14"|Coriander Cumin is the host of The Tasty Treat. When his daughter Saffron welcomes Pinkie Pie and Rarity to this restaurant, he unintentionally sets up the chairs and packs up plates.
|-
|DJ Pon-3/Vinyl Scratch
|Female
|White
|Blue
|Moderate cerise
|Blue (season 1)  Pink (season 5)
|Two quavers
|2011
|Friendship Is Magic
|None 
|4
|-
|style="border-bottom: 3px solid #6603AA;" colspan="14"|DJ Pon-3 is a background character in My Little Pony: Friendship is Magic, who first appeared as a DJ at Rarity's fashion show in the episode "Suited For Success." Fans gave her the name DJ Pon-3 due to her talent; this name was later mentioned in The Hub's "Equestria Girls" ad. She appeared again in "A Canterlot Wedding Part 2", in which she performed at the wedding reception. During that time, Pinkie Pie pulled her out onto the DJ booth, and her eyes were revealed. She later appeared in "Magical Mystery Cure" during the song "What My Cutie Mark is Telling Me", and was shown seven times in the film Equestria Girls. Two of the scenes she appeared in were during the film's namesake song, when Applejack removed her trademark sunglasses, and during the reprise of the song "This Is Our Big Night", when she performed during the Fall Formal. She then appeared in "Simple Ways" and "Testing, Testing, 1-2-3" in season four before appearing in "Rainbow Rocks" as the Rainbooms' disc jockey.
|-
|Fancy Pants
|Male
|White
|Turquoise
|Blue gray
|Gold
|Three golden crowns
|2011
|Friendship Is Magic
|Trevor Devall
|4
|-
|style="border-bottom: 3px solid #6603AA;" colspan="14"|Fancy Pants is a sociable Unicorn pony of high social status. First appearing in the episode "Sweet and Elite", he is kind to Rarity, and admires the dress she made for Twilight, though it's unfinished and "simple" compared to most other Canterlot dress. He also shows an eagerness to meet Rarity's friends, even though they're from Ponyville. His overall attitude stands in contrast to that of other residents of Canterlot, who are generally distasteful of "rustic" fashion and ponies from the countryside. 
|-
|Fizzy
|Female
|Turquoise
|Pink, white, dark pink and green
|Pink
|Unknown
|Fizzy sodas
|1986
|My Little Pony: The Movie
|Katie Leigh
|1
|-
|style="border-bottom: 3px solid #6603AA;" colspan="14"|Fizzy is described to be a bit of an airhead but lovable and laid-back. Her horn can make bubbles from water or air and can move them around, though she doesn't always have complete control. She appears in 'My Little Pony: The Movie', 'The End Of Flutter Valley', 'The Ghost Of Paradise Estate', 'Sweetstuff And The Treasure Hunt', 'The Return Of Tambeleon', 'The Magic Coins', 'Mish Mash Melee', 'The Quest Of The Princess Ponies', and mentioned in 'Bright Lights.' In the UK comic books, she ran a Guy Fawkes Night-style holiday called Fizziwhizz Night.
|-
|Flam
|Male
|Tan
|Red and white
|Green
|Green
|Red apple
|2012
|Friendship Is Magic
|Scott McNeil
|4
|-
|style="border-bottom: 3px solid #6603AA;" colspan="14"|Flam is the twin brother of Flim. He uses his unicorn magic to make apple cider. The brothers both debuted in the Friendship is Magic episode "The Super Speedy Cider Squeezy 6000".
|-
|Fleur Dis Lee
|Female
|White
|Pale pink with whitish pink highlights
|Lavender
|Pink
|Three fleurs-de-lis
|2011
|Friendship Is Magic
|Nicole Oliver 
|4
|-
|style="border-bottom: 3px solid #6603AA;" colspan="14"|Fleur Dis Lee is a sociable Unicorn pony of high social status. She also meets Rarity in the episode "Sweet and Elite" talking about life in Canterlot.

Fleur Dis Lee's human counterpart appears in My Little Pony: Equestria Girls – Friendship Games as a student of Crystal Prep.
|-
|Flim Skim
|Male
|Tan
|Red and white
|Green
|Green
|Apple with missing piece
|2012
|Friendship Is Magic
|Samuel Vincent
|4
|-
|style="border-bottom: 3px solid #6603AA;" colspan="14"|Flim is the twin brother of Flam. He uses his unicorn magic to make apple cider. The brothers both debuted in the "Friendship is Magic" episode "The Super Speedy Cider Squeezy 6000".
|-
|Galaxy
|Female
|Pinkish purple
|Red, pink, white and orange
|Pink
|Unknown
|Purple stars arranged in the shape of the Big Dipper
|1986
|My Little Pony (1986 TV series)
|Sherry Lynn
|1
|-
|style="border-bottom: 3px solid #6603AA;" colspan="14"|Galaxy is described to be quite intelligent, resourceful, and seen as the voice of reason. She has a magical intuition and can generate light and heat with her horn. She appears in 'The Ghost Of Paradise Estate', 'Bright Lights', 'The Return Of Tambeleon', 'The Magic Coins', 'Would-Be Dragonslayer', 'Baby, It's Cold Outside', 'The Quest Of The rincess Ponies', and cameoed in 'Sweetstuff And The Treasure Hunt.' She only appeared in two UK comic books.
|-
|Glory/Baby Glory
|Female
|White
|Purple with a blue streak in mane
|Blue (toy version)Purple (animation)
|Unknown
|Purple and silver shooting star
|1983
|"Rescue From Midnight Castle" (Glory)"Escape from Catrina" (Baby Glory)
|Fran Brill (as Glory)Katie Leigh (as Baby Glory)
|1
|-
|style="border-bottom: 3px solid #6603AA;" colspan="14"|A main character of Rescue From Midnight Castle. Glory is described to be the most elegant of all the Unicorn Ponies and moves from place to place with a magical stride, almost as though she had wings. Her magic takes her from kingdom to kingdom in search of a young girl who believes in magic and in unicorns. She also likes jumping and has a daughter named Baby Glory, who is described to be brave. Glory is the inspiration for the Friendship is Magic incarnation of Rarity, alongside Sparkler and Majesty.
|-
|Gusty/Baby Gusty
|Female
|White (Original)Unknown (FiM)
|Green with a red streak (Original)Unknown (FiM)
|Blue (Original)Unknown (FiM)
|Unknown
|Maple leaves
|19842019
|My Little Pony: The MovieFriendship Is Magic
|Nancy Cartwright (as Gusty) (Original)Katie Leigh (as Baby Gusty) (Original)N/A (FiM)
|1, 4
|-
|style="border-bottom: 3px solid #6603AA;" colspan="14"|Gusty is a unicorn pony who has an impatient streak and is grouchy. She is athletic and brave, and can use her horn to summon the wind. She has one daughter named Baby Gusty, who shares the same impatient streak. Gusty appears again in flashbacks of the final season of Friendship is Magic as the pony who defeated Grogar.
|-
|Izzy Moonbow
|Female
|Lavender
|Blue and purple
|Purple
|Unknown
|A button inside a heart with three pins
|2021
|My Little Pony: A New Generation
|Kimiko Glenn
|5
|-
|style="border-bottom: 3px solid #6603AA;" colspan="14"|Izzy Moonbow is one of the main characters of A New Generation. Toward the start of the movie, she wanders into the unicorn-fearing town of Maretime Bay where she meets Sunny Starscout. When Izzy says the unicorns don't have magic, the two of them start a journey to restore it. Unlike all of the other unicorns in Bridlewood Forest, whose demeanor is dour in nature from having lost magic, Izzy remains cheerful. It is revealed that Izzy wandered into Maretime Bay when she found a lantern sent by Sunny Starscout as a filly, asking for unicorns and pegasi to visit.
Her hobby is making different things out of regular objects, which she dubs Unicorn Upcycling, or "Unicycling". She can sense a pony's "sparkle", or "luminescence", which can come in many different colors.
|-
|Joe (a.k.a. Pony Joe, a.k.a. Donut Joe)
|Male
|Light amber
|Moderate orange
|Green
|Unknown
|Donut
|2011
|Friendship Is Magic
|Vincent Tong
|4
|-
|style="border-bottom: 3px solid #6603AA;" colspan="14"|Joe is a unicorn and a baker that appears in the episodes The Best Night Ever and MMMystery on the Friendship Express. In the former he is addressed as Pony Joe by Spike once, and in the latter as Donut Joe by Twilight Sparkle once, and simply as Joe from then on. Joe first appears in The Best Night Ever, as the owner of a donut shop in Canterlot. Twilight Sparkle and Spike state that they were frequent customers of Joe while they resided in Canterlot. He next appears aboard a train to Canterlot in MMMystery on the Friendship Express, gloating about how his Donutopia will win first place at the National Dessert Competition instead of the Cakes' Marzipan Mascarpone Meringue Madness. Joe is later under suspicion when Pinkie Pie theorizes that he is the culprit behind the damaging of the Cakes' cake, until Twilight proves that Joe did not do it after the other bakers' entries are eaten. When accused by Pinkie Pie, Joe is shown as a spy agent reminiscent of the James Bond series. Joe later admits to eating Gustave's éclairs, and Mulia admits to eating his Donutopia. At Pinkie's suggestion, the remainder of Joe's Donutopia was combined with the leftover treats to form a new cake for the competition. Joe appears to be a friendly and prideful baker, believing without a doubt his Donutopia will win first prize. When he is accused of eating Gustave's éclairs, he admits it was not out of spite, but rather because of how Pinkie Pie described it, and sincerely compliments Gustave. It is also revealed that in "Amending Fences", Joe works in Ponyville's donut cafe.
|-
|Lemon Hearts
|Female
|Lemon yellow
|Columbia blue with a maya blue streak
|Raspberry
|Purplish pink
|Three blue hearts; two blue, one green 
|2010
|Friendship Is Magic
|Ashleigh Ball
|4
|-
|style="border-bottom: 3px solid #6603AA;" colspan="14"|Lemon Hearts is a female unicorn pony who appeared in some episodes of My Little Pony: Friendship Is Magic. Lemon Hearts is commonly featured as a background pony. During running sequences, her eye style changes to one resembling Rarity's and her eye color turns blue. She makes her first appearance in Friendship is Magic, part 1, in Canterlot. She appears before Twilight Sparkle, alongside Twinkleshine and Minuette, while carrying a present on her back. She has no spoken lines, but she receives Twinkleshine's remark about Twilight when the studious unicorn turns down the offer to join them at Moondancer's get-together. Later in the episode, she appears at Pinkie Pie's party in Ponyville's library and is among the ponies who visually yell "Surprise!" to Twilight. Since then, Lemon Hearts has been a common sight in Ponyville. She attends the Grand Galloping Gala in The Best Night Ever and makes it into the V.I.P. section. She takes photos of Wonderbolts Spitfire and Soarin' with fellow Gala attendees "North Star" and "Masquerade". In "Putting Your Hoof Down", she offers two bits for the cherry Fluttershy wanted to buy for Angel's salad. An alicorn version of that character appears in "Rainbow Falls" due to an animation error.
|-
|Lily Lightly
|Female
|Purple
|Light pink, pink and purple
|Blue
|Unknown
|Pink lily flower on a blue stem with little stars below
|2006
|A Very Pony Place
|Erin Mathews
|3
|-
|style="border-bottom: 3px solid #6603AA;" colspan="14"|Lily Lightly debuted in 2006 as a special pony with a light-up horn and a pretty pink gown and then debuted again in My Little Pony: A Very Pony Place. Dubbed the "Princess of All that Twinkles and Glows", Lily Lightly has a special horn which lights up when she is sad or happy. Though Lily finds her ability strange, her friends view it as part of her uniqueness.
|-
|Lyra Heartstrings
|Female
|Mint green
|Pale, light grayish cyan with a white streak
|Brilliant amber
|Gold
|Lyre
|2010
|Friendship Is Magic
|Britt McKillip ("A Canterlot Wedding")  Ashleigh Ball ("Slice of Life")
|4
|-
|style="border-bottom: 3px solid #6603AA;" colspan="14"|Lyra Heartstrings is a background pony who appeared in some episodes of My Little Pony: Friendship Is Magic as one of the running gags of the show. Lyra is seen on the show doing background gags, such as bouncing on clouds, jumping around excitedly, drinking from a cup, or slouching on a park bench. She is frequently seen next to another background pony named Sweetie Drops. The pairing has been explained by a layout artist to be mostly coincidental and based on aesthetic considerations, as far as season one is concerned. The two are depicted talking in crowd scenes, enjoying a snack, or watching Applejack and Rainbow Dash during the Iron Pony Competition. In Lesson Zero, at one point in the background she physically fights one-on-one against Bon Bon for the possession of Smarty Pants. In "A Canterlot Wedding" Part 1 and Part 2, she is one of Queen Chrysalis's first bridesmaids, along with Minuette and Twinkleshine. In Part 1, she has a speaking role commenting on their dresses, saying that she loves them. In Part 2, she speaks in unison with the other two bridesmaids. Lyra also appears in Rainbow Rocks as one of the competitors in the Mane Event, together with Sweetie Drops. In the show's final season, she gets married with Bon Bon.

Her name is not mentioned on-screen, until it first appeared in the accompanying pamphlet of a surprise bag toy released in early November 2011. 
|-
|Majesty
|Female
|White
|Blue with silver streak in mane
|Purple
|Unknown
|Five glittery blue flowers
|1984
|The Magic Nut TreeThe Trolls and the Castle of DarknessThe Cross Weather WitchA Shock at The Stable Show
|N/A
|1
|-
|style="border-bottom: 3px solid #6603AA;" colspan="14"|Majesty is a unicorn pony, who appears only in the UK My Little Pony books: The Magic Nut Tree, The Trolls and the Castle of Darkness, The Cross Weather Witch and A Shock at the Stable Show. She is one of the most magical ponies, lives in the Dream Castle with her pet dragon Spike, and lowers the drawbridge when friends drop round for tea. She can makes wishes come true when she twirls her magic horn. Majesty is one of the inspirations for the Friendship is Magic incarnation of Rarity, alongside Glory and Sparkler.
|-
|Mimic
|Female
|Light yellow-green
|Chartreuse, light pink and green
|Green (toy version)Yellow (animation)
|Unknown
|Parrot
|1986
|My Little Pony (1986 TV series)
|Nancy Cartwright
|1
|-
|style="border-bottom: 3px solid #6603AA;" colspan="14"|Mimic is a unicorn pony and the descendant of the first unicorn in Ponyland. Mimic has incredible powers far beyond the other unicorn ponies. With the power of the Golden Horseshoes, she is able to levitate things, glow brightly, read minds and see the future. After she falls ill, Megan and the Ponies goes in search for the Golden Horseshoes to restore Mimic's health back to normal.
|-
|Minuette
|Female
|Mayan blue
|Periwinkle with dark blue streak
|Dark blue
|Various in different episodes
|Hourglass
|2010
|Friendship Is Magic
|Cathy Weseluck (first two seasons)Rebecca Hussain (season 5)
|4
|-
|style="border-bottom: 3px solid #6603AA;" colspan="14"|Minuette is a female unicorn pony who appeared in some episodes of My Little Pony: Friendship Is Magic. Minuette is a recurring background character in the series, first appearing in Friendship is Magic, part 1, as one of the trio of ponies heading to Moondancer's get-together, appearing in front of Twilight Sparkle near the beginning of the episode. Despite the scene being situated in Canterlot, Minuette also appears all over Ponyville. In the episode Winter Wrap Up, she is first seen as a member of the plant team, hornless. She later appears as part of the animal team with her horn included, and during the ice-carving scene she participates as a member of the weather team. In the moment that she is part of the plant team, she is touching heads with Berry Punch while singing. In Secret of my Excess, she accidentally collides with Cherry Berry while running away from Spike. In "A Canterlot Wedding" Part 1 and Part 2, she is one of Queen Chrysalis's first bridesmaids, along with Lyra Heartstrings and Twinkleshine. She has a speaking role in Part 1 and speaks in unison with the other two bridesmaids in Part 2. She has the latest major role in "Amending Fences" where Twilight Sparkle (who's now an alicorn) promises to accept the suggestion to Moondancer's get-together, with the magic of Friendship and Pinkie Pie on her side.
|-
|Moondancer/Baby Moondancer
|Female
|White (Generation 1)Blue (Generation 3) Light yellow (Generation 4)
|Red with purple streak in mane (Generations 1 and 4)Pink with Purple streak in mane (Baby Moondancer)Yellow (Generation 3)
|Blue (Generation 1)Pink (Baby Moondancer)Purple (Generations 3 and 4)
|Light pink
|Silver crescent moon surrounded by red stars (Generation 1)Yellow crescent moon and stars on a blue background (Generation 3)
|1983 (Generation 1)2003 (Generation 3)
|Rescue From Midnight Castle
|Laura Dean (as Moondancer)Alice Playten (as Baby Moondancer)Kazumi Evans (Generation 4)
|1, 3, 4
|-
|style="border-bottom: 3px solid #6603AA;" colspan="14"|A main character of Rescue From Midnight Castle. Moondancer is a unicorn pony who debuted in 1983 as part of the second wave of the Generation 1 Toyline. Moondancer then made her brief appearance in the first My Little Pony special Rescue From Midnight Castle. Moondancer is one of the four kidnapped ponies in Dream Valley during Scorpan's raid. Out of the four, she is the only unicorn pony who was corrupted by Tirek's Rainbow of Darkness in order to pull his chariot. She was reverted to normal after Tirek was destroyed. She has a daughter named Baby Moondancer, who is very shy. She got kidnapped by Catrina along with the Rainbow of Light to be used as a ransom to force the Bushwoolies to go back to her. Moondancer then later appeared in the Generation 3 toyline, with her appearance becoming an Earth pony rather than a unicorn. She is one of Twinkle Twirl's students who love to dance. According to Lauren Faust, Moondancer is meant to be a main character for My Little Pony: Friendship is Magic. However, due to the loss of almost all of the Generation 1 Names, she was then revamped and remade into Twilight Sparkle. She was only mentioned during the first episode of the series as a tribute.
Moondancer was first mentioned in the first episode of Friendship is Magic, where she is said to be holding a party that Twilight was asked to come to, but Twilight refused. In Season 5 she makes her debut, where she has a messy tied up mane and wears a pair of aged eyeglasses and a dark purple turtleneck sweater with pink buttons on the front. Moondancer was affectedvery negatively by Twilight's prior refusal, and she became a recluse who only visits the library and does nothing else, proving to be a glimpse of what Twilight would have become has she not met the rest of the Mane 6. Learning that Moondancer was hurt by Twilight after trying to open herself up to her, Twilight eventually fixes her mistake.
|-
|Neon Lights
|Male
|Light blue
|Gray
|Blue
|Cyan
|Three white five-point stars
|2012
|?
|
|4
|-
|style="border-bottom: 3px solid #6603AA;" colspan="14"|Neon Lights is one of the minor characters in Friendship is Magic.
|-
|Party Favor
|Male
|Light blue
|Dark blue with lighter highlights
|Blue
|Pink
|Party balloons and streamers (regained)
|2015
|"The Cutie Map"
My Little Pony: The Movie
|Samuel Vincent (My Little Pony series)
Zahari Baharov (My Little Pony: The Movie)
|4
|-
|style="border-bottom: 3px solid #6603AA;" colspan="14"|Party Favor is one of a group of four prominent ponies featured in The Cutie Map. Having given up his cutie mark and talent for making this out of balloons to live in Starlight's village, he and a few others instead desire their cutie marks back. When Starlight is overthrown, he regains his talent and uses it to build a balloon bridge to help the protagonists.
|-
|Powder
|Female
|Purple
|White with red streak in mane
|Pink
|Unknown
|Five glittery white snowflakes
|1984
|"Escape From Catrina"
|Jeannie Elias
|1
|-
|style="border-bottom: 3px solid #6603AA;" colspan="14"|Powder is a unicorn pony, who is present in the opening sequence of "Escape From Catrina", giving Megan the Rainbow of Light.
|-
|Prince Blueblood
|Male
|White
|Light amber
|Cyan
|Unknown
|Eight-pointed compass rose
|2010
|Friendship Is Magic
|Vincent Tong
|4
|-
|style="border-bottom: 3px solid #6603AA;" colspan="14"|Prince Blueblood is a unicorn pony and Rarity's love affection. In Rarity's fantasy, they swiftly fall in love and marry. Prince Blueblood appears outwardly the same in The Best Night Ever, where Rarity expects him to court her as he did in her dream, but he is too self-centered. Rarity expects Prince Blueblood to give her a rose, but he takes it for himself; he brings a cushion only for himself to sit in the castle's yard, leaving Rarity without a comfortable seat; she expects Blueblood to throw his coat over a puddle so her shoes won't get dirty, but he coerces to throw her shawl; he expects her to pay for his dining; and he generally ignores her wants, and patronizes "common ponies". He even goes as far as using Rarity as a pony shield from getting cake all over his clothes. Prince Blueblood's title was initially supposed to be 'Duke', and that he's the "great great great great great great great great great great great (and probably even more greats) nephew on Celestia's and Luna's mother's side, about 52 times removed, roughly speaking." Later, Amy Keating Rogers confirmed that Prince Blueblood is not Celestia's nephew.
|-
|Princess Sparkle
|Female
|Lavender
|Aqua
|Green (toy version)Turquoise (animation)
|Unknown
|Gold flower-shaped medallion with a green jewel
|1986
|My Little Pony (1986 TV series)
|Alice Playten
|1
|-
|style="border-bottom: 3px solid #6603AA;" colspan="14"|One of the six Princess Ponies, Princess Sparkle is one of the keepers of the Magic Wands which maintains the balance of Ponyland's magic, until it was stolen by Lavan, the Lava Demon. She usually has feuds with the other Princess Ponies on who should be queen, until they settled their differences and work together. Princess Sparkle's wand allows her to manipulate plants.
|-
|Pumpkin Cake
|Female
|Yellow
|Orange
|Light blue
|Light blue
|N/A
|2012
|Friendship Is Magic
|Andrea Libman
|4
|-
|style="border-bottom: 3px solid #6603AA;" colspan="14"|Pumpkin Cake is one of Carrot Cake and Cup Cake's newborn twins, the other being her brother Pound Cake. She has good magic despite her young age; Rarity's explanation for this is that "baby unicorns get strange magic surges that come and go". Her bad habit is that she likes to suck and chew on toys and other objects.
|-
|Rarity
|Female
|white
| indigo-purple 
|Deep blue with pale blue eyeshadow
|pink (season 1), blue (present), green (under the spell of the book found by Spike)
|Heart with multiple-colored swirls surrounding (Generation 3)Three light blue diamonds (Generation 4)
|2006 (Generation 3)2010 (Generation 4)
|Crystal Princess: The Runaway Rainbow (Generation 3)Friendship Is Magic (Generation 4)
|Cathy Weseluck (G3)Tabitha St. Germain (G4 (speaking))Kazumi Evans (G4 (singing))
|3, 4
|-
|style="border-bottom: 3px solid #6603AA;" colspan="14"|Rarity is an energetic unicorn pony with a white body, deep blue eyes and a indigo-purple mane and tail. She was originally a young unicorn chosen to be one of the Rainbow Princesses. Rarity is very cheerful, energetic, full of mischief and sometimes values fun more than her duties. She also can feel sad and lonely after she misses her hometown and wanting to come back As one of the Rainbow Princesses alongside Brights Brightly, Cheerilee and Whistle Wishes, she was in charge on bringing in the first rainbow of the season and also using the Magic Wand. The Magic Wand allows her to control the colors to bring in the first rainbow of the season and lets her summon the Crystal Carriage. When it's not in use, she stores it inside her mane. In Friendship is Magic, Rarity became an older unicorn in the series. She is very stylish and beautiful, takes great interest in fashion and clothing design. She loves praise and acclaim and often tries to make herself the center of attention. However, she is glad to drop everything and make new outfits for her friends, even when they prove very hard to please. She is both a business owner and fashion designer, running the Carousel Boutique in Ponyville. She considers herself a lady and often acts sophisticated. She can also be very dramatic, often when a disaster occurs to her. She is Sweetie Belle's older sister and dreams of becoming a designer for Princess Celestia. She fantasized about marrying Celestia's nephew Prince Blueblood, until he she actually met him, where he turned out to be snobbish, rude, and self-centred. Rarity's magic has been demonstrated to involve both telekinesis and finding nearby jewels buried underground. Rarity's elemental spirit is Generosity.
|-
|Ribbon/Baby Ribbon
|Female
|Blue
|Yellow with orange streak in mane
|Green
|Unknown
|White ribbon
|1986
|My Little Pony: The Movie|Katie Leigh
|1
|-
|style="border-bottom: 3px solid #6603AA;" colspan="14"|Ribbon is very mature and motherly to her daughter, Baby Ribbon, and is also telepathic, a power she uses to contact Megan when she is captured at Tambelon. Baby Ribbon has a lot of difficulty winking in and out and is close to Baby Gusty. She is also telepathic.
|-
|Royal Unicorn Guards
|Male
|Gray
|White
|Yellow
|Unknown
|Various
|2010
|Friendship Is Magic|N/A
|4
|-
|style="border-bottom: 3px solid #6603AA;" colspan="14"|Unicorn Royal guards first appear in the Friendship Is Magic opening scene, and make subsequent appearances in future episodes.
|-
|Saffron Masala
|Female
|Orange
|Purplish brunette
|Purple
|Purple
|Lavender lily
|2016
|"Spice Up Your Life"
|Diana Kaarina
|4
|-
|style="border-bottom: 3px solid #6603AA;" colspan="14"|Saffron is the daughter of Coriander Cumin. She likes to cook Indian food for a restaurant called the Tasty Treat. She has an Eastern Indian accent.
|-
|Sassy Saddles
|Female
|Light blue
|Orange and yellow with a purple understreak
|Orange
|Light yellow
|Pins (covered)
|2015
|"Canterlot Boutique"
|Kelly Sheridan
|4
|-
|style="border-bottom: 3px solid #6603AA;" colspan="14"|Sassy Saddles appears in the episode Canterlot Boutique. As the manager of Rarity's Canterlot store, she has a comprehensive vision of how to achieve success, but this puts a strain on Rarity and takes the enjoyment and artistry out of dressmaking for her, after having to design 100 copies of a specific new dress. After realizing this, Sassy Saddles decides to do things Rarity's way.
|-
|Shining Armor
|Male
|Turquoisish white
|Moderate sapphire blue and moderate cerulean
|Moderate cerulean
|Magenta
|Pink six-pointed star over a purple shield with three small light blue stars above it
|2012
|Friendship Is Magic|Andrew Francis
|4
|-
|style="border-bottom: 3px solid #6603AA;" colspan="14"|Shining Armor is a unicorn pony and also the leader of the Canterlot Royal Guards. He is the older brother of Twilight Sparkle and the husband of Princess Cadance, which shocks his little sister upon hearing the news. Although very close to his sister, he has evidently lost touch with her as a result of her relocation to Ponyville. Initially, he is happy to see Twilight again upon her return to Canterlot, asking her to be his Best Mare at the wedding. However, due to a spell put on him, this excitement quickly turns to frustration and anger as she - unbeknownst to the rest of the cast, correctly - decries the Changeling Queen Chrysalis, in the form of Cadance, as evil and unworthy of her brother. After Twilight manages to expose and defeat the Queen and rescue all of Canterlot, including her brother, in addition to then arranging a wedding, the siblings reconcile with his profound gratitude.
|-
|Snails
|Male
|Gold
|Medium aquamarine
|Black
|Unknown
|Snail
|2010
|Friendship is Magic|Richard Ian Cox
|4
|-
|style="border-bottom: 3px solid #6603AA;" colspan="14"|Snails is often seen in the company of his friend Snips and is shown to be slow in nature and mind. He admires the bragging magician Trixie along with Snips. In later seasons, he shows proficiency at the unicorn position while playing buckball.
|-
|Snips
|Male
|Pale cyan
|Ochre
|Black
|Unknown
|Pair of scissors
|2010
|Friendship is Magic|Lee Tockar
|4
|-
|style="border-bottom: 3px solid #6603AA;" colspan="14"|Snips is an excitable and goofy pony, who jumps eagerly at the slightest inclination. He is unusually short and round, and may be one of the smallest in Ponyville. He is characterized by small black eyes, bucked teeth, dark eyebrows, and a high and scratchy voice. These features grant him a unique appearance relative to the other residents of Ponyville. In Boast Busters, his first appearance, he displayed an infatuation with Trixie, a braggart magician.
|-
|Sparkler/Amethyst Star
|Female
|Pale blue (Generation 1)  Pale magenta (Generation 4)
|Purple with a red streak (Generation 1)  Purple with a light purple streak (Generation 4)
|Purple
|Purple
|Diamonds
|1984
|"Escape From Catrina"
|Ivy Austin (Generation 1)  Cathy Weseluck (Generation 4)
|1, 4
|-
|style="border-bottom: 3px solid #6603AA;" colspan="14"|Sparkler is a unicorn pony, who is present in the opening sequence of "Escape From Catrina", painting the welcome sign for Megan's return and also during the end of the special, wearing a cheerleader outfit and likes to dance. Sparkler is one of the inspirations for the Friendship is Magic incarnation of Rarity, alongside Glory and Majesty.

A pony with a similar name (Amethyst Star) appears as a background character in Friendship is Magic.
|-
|Starflower
|Female
|Blue
|Coral, pink, aqua and neon yellow (toy version)Orange, pink, light blue, and green (animation)
|Green
|Unknown
|Six glittery dark pink stars
|1984 (Generation 1)2006 (Generation 3)
|"Escape From Catrina"
|Alice Playten
|1, 3
|-
|style="border-bottom: 3px solid #6603AA;" colspan="14"|Starflower is a unicorn pony and one of the two Rainbow Ponies alongside Skydancer. She is present in the opening sequence of "Escape From Catrina", doing decorations for Megan's return in Ponyland. She has not demonstrated any magical ability with her horn. Generation 3 Starflower was released in 2006 as part of the Crystal Design set even though her symbol is not 3D.
|-
|Starlight Glimmer
|Female
|Lilac
|Violet with lighter and teal streak
|Purple-blue
|Turquoise
|Purple star with cyan waves
|2015
|"The Cutie Map" – Part 1
|Kelly Sheridan
|4
|-
|style="border-bottom: 3px solid #6603AA;" colspan="14"|Starlight Glimmer is a unicorn pony with a light lilac body, purple-blue eyes and a violet mane and tail with a lighter and teal streak. She is the main antagonist in season 5 of Friendship is Magic. She was the leader of a remote town forcing equality by having everyone forgo their talents and sharing the same equal sign cutie mark, until she was revealed not to have changed her own cutie mark, leading to the ponies turning against her. In the season finale, The Cutie Re-mark, she attempts to rewrite time as revenge so that Rainbow Dash never performs the Sonic Rainboom that leads to the rest of the Mane 6 getting their cutie marks, but this results in increasingly bleaker futures in the present every time she does it. After admitting that the motivation for starting her town was that a childhood friend of hers, Sunburst, got his Cutie Mark and headed off to Celestia's school never to be seen again, Twilight convinces her to start friendship anew, and later Starlight becomes a major supporting character alongside the Mane 6. At the start of Season 6, she even reunites and reconciles with Sunburst.
|-
|Starswirl the Bearded
|Male
|Gray
|White
|Blue
|White
|
|
|-
|style="border-bottom: 3px solid #6603AA;" colspan="14"|Starswirl the Bearded is a wizard from many years ago of great renown, and idol to Twilight Sparkle, but did not truly grasp the powers of friendship. He is often mentioned throughout the series, but finally appears in the Season 7 finale, Shadow Play, where he is revealed to be one of six legendary heroes of the past called the Pillars of Equestria, who sealed the Pony of Shadows away in limbo, while sealing themselves away in the process. Once Twilight finds out what happened and undoes the seal, releasing them all, Starswirl is very terse with her, and attempts to re-seal the Pony of Shadows by sacrificing the Elements of Harmony. It is only after learning that the Pony of Shadows used to be the Pillars' founder and friend, a unicorn named Stygian, and turned to darkness after a major misunderstanding, Starlight Glimmer and Twilight help to convince him and the Pillars to mend their friendship instead, and Starswirl sees the error of his ways, coming out more respectful of Twilight.
|-
|Sugar Belle
|Female
|Light pink
|Bright magenta 
|Bright pink
|Turquoise
|Purple cupcake with a red cherry on top and surrounded with colorful sprinkles (regained)
|2015
|"The Cutie Map" – Part 1
|Rebecca Shoichet
|4
|-
|style="border-bottom: 3px solid #6603AA;" colspan="14"|Sugar Belle is a unicorn pony with a light pink body, bright pink eyes and a bright magenta mane and tail. She was the baker of the equalized town in Equestria, but could not bake well after giving up her cutie mark.
In later seasons, after getting her cutie mark back, Big Mac develops an infatuation with her, which is eventually given back, and the two of them marry toward the end of the series.
|-
|Sunburst
|Male
|Orange with white bottom legs and snout
|Red with orange highlights
|Cyan
|Yellow
|Sun surrounded by teal stars unleashing rays
|2015
|"The Cutie Re-Mark" - Part 2
|Ian Hanlin
|4
|-
|style="border-bottom: 3px solid #6603AA;" colspan="14"|Sunburst is Starlight Glimmer's old friend who first taught her magic when they were foals, but was sent off to Celestia's unicorn school after getting his cutie mark. Now as a grownup stallion, he has a long, thin beard, a pair of glasses and a wizard's cape. When meeting Starlight Glimmer again after many years, he admits that he was not able to perform magic well enough at the school, but he had amassed a wealth of magic knowledge, which is instrumental in restoring the shattered Crystal Heart and saving the Crystal Empire. He then becomes Flurry Heart's Crystaller at the Empire, and rekindles his friendship with Starlight.
|-
|Sunset Shimmer
|Female
|Light amber
|Red with yellow streak
|Cyan-green
|Sea-green (originally)Red (EG series)
|Red and yellow yin-yang sign with sun rays
|2013
|Equestria Girls|Rebecca Shoichet
|4
|-
|style="border-bottom: 3px solid #6603AA;" colspan="14"|Sunset Shimmer is an antagonist unicorn pony with a light amber body, cyan-green eyes and a red mane and tail with a yellow streak. She first appeared in Equestria Girls. She is also one of the ponies who is mainly in human form. She is one of Princess Celestia's old students. She was the bully of Canterlot High School, intimidating others and humiliating them to get her way. She stole Twilight's crown but lost it in the human world and tried to prevent Twilight from getting it back by humiliating her. After stealing it again after Twilight wins it back, she puts it on and transforms into a she-demon, and uses her new powers to mind control everyone in the school to be her own army to take over Equestria. Twilight's crown however sensed Twilight's friendship with her human friends and granted them magic to defeat Sunset and undo her dark magic. Sunset came to regret her misdeeds and was offered friendship by Twilight and her friends. She also appears in Rainbow Rocks as a reformed character, now on the side of Twilight Sparkle and her friends. She attempts to be helpful but nobody in the school trusts her after her past misdeeds. Sunset feels like an outsider for much of the film, even to her own friends, and is constantly reminded, accidentally, about her past evil actions and demon form. When her friends begin to argue and empower the Dazzlings during the finals, she finally confronts them over the small problems they have been having but not facing and tells them that unless they work out all their problems from the start, the magic of friendship can be turned into something else. She then helps Twilight and the others defeat the Dazzlings, gaining her own magic half-pony form and gaining the acceptance of the rest of the school.
|-
|Sweetie Belle
|Female
|white
|Purple and light purple with a pink highlight in mane (Generation 3)lavender with light pink streak (Generation 4)
|Green
|Light green
|Sparkly pink heart (Generation 3) Red, white, and purple shield with star and eighth note in center (Generation 4)
|2008 (Generation 3)2011 (Generation 4)
|Meet the Ponies (Generation 3)Friendship Is Magic (Generation 4)
|Andrea Libman (G3)Claire Corlett (G4)Michelle Creber (singing voice, G4; seasons 1-3)
|3, 4
|-
|style="border-bottom: 3px solid #6603AA;" colspan="14"|Sweetie Belle is a filly unicorn pony with a white-grey body, green eyes and a lavender mane and tail with a light pink streak, and a member of the Core 7 ponies. Usually the youngest of the group, she hails from Unicornia, before being teleported to Ponyville when she was once a foal. She has a big heart and likes to bake sweets for her friends. She also can demonstrate magic; however, this was only shown in "Once Upon a My Little Pony Time", where she used it to fix Rainbow Dash's scarf. In Friendship is Magic, she is a young unicorn pony and also Rarity's younger sister. She is also one of Apple Bloom's friends, and a member of the "Cutie Mark Crusaders". Sweetie Belle tends to be a slower thinker than Apple Bloom and Scootaloo, but is as excitable as they are and will readily follow their lead. Though she wants to be a designer like Rarity, her inexperience and clumsiness prove to be a hindrance when she tries to assist in the shop. She has a talent for singing and songwriting, turning one of Fluttershy's lullabies into a rousing gospel number, but prefers not to sing in public.
|-
|Trenderhoof
|Male
|Light brown
|Blond
|Purple
|Purple
|Symmetry pattern
|2014
|Friendship Is Magic|Doron Bell
|4
|-
|style="border-bottom: 3px solid #6603AA;" colspan="14"|Trenderhoof is a unicorn pony who writes for a Canterlot newspaper, and Rarity is highly in love with him. When he shows up to write about a Ponyville event, Rarity attempts to meet him, but upon seeing Sweet Apple Acres, he instead becomes smitten with Applejack and her farm lifestyle.
|-
|Trixie Lulamoon
|Female
|Blue
|Two-tone light blue
|Purple
|Pink (in her normal use)Red (when wearing the Alicorn Amulet)
|Star-tipped magic wand spreading stardust
|2010
|Friendship Is Magic|Kathleen Barr
|4
|-
|style="border-bottom: 3px solid #6603AA;" colspan="14"|Trixie Lulamoon (who refers to herself in third person as The Great and Powerful Trixie) is a unicorn pony with a blue body, purple eyes and a two-tone light blue mane and tail, and a traveling magician. She visits Ponyville with her show, in which she greatly exaggerates her magical abilities through the use of fireworks and stage effects, and claims to have defeated an Ursa Major. Shortly thereafter, Trixie is unable to defeat an Ursa Minor, the infant offspring of the Ursa Major, when it attacks Ponyville after being startled out of its nap. After Twilight calms it down, Trixie admits her deception and flees from Ponyville. She returns in "Magic Duel" where it is revealed her career was ruined after what happened and had to work on a rock farm for a living. She obtained the Alicorn Amulet, giving her immense power but slowly corrupting her. She challenged Twilight to magic duel and won, then banished Twilight from the town to remake it in her image. When Twilight's friends learned of the amulet and informed Twilight, they devised a plan where Twilight challenged Trixie to a rematch with her own supposedly more powerful amulet, performimg tremendous magical feats. When Trixie removed her Alicorn Amulet to steal this other amulet, she realized it was fake, learning that Twilight's supposed magic was pulled off through more clever and deceptive means. Freed from her corruption, Trixie later apologized to Twilight for what she did to her and her friends while under the influence of the amulet and became friends with Twilight before once again leaving Ponyville.

In the film Equestria Girls, Trixie is seen getting peanut butter crackers from the school's vending machine and makes several background cameos. She appears as the secondary antagonist and is the leader of her own band, the Illusions, in "Rainbow Rocks". She like most of the school becomes overly competitive while under the Dazzlings spell when the showcase is turned into a competition. Her band makes it to the semi-finals and becomes angered when she loses to the Rainbooms despite the ladder not finishing their song. She is convinced by the Dazzlings to stop the Rainbooms from performing by trapping them under the stage. With the Rainbooms apparently forfeiting Trixie's band plays in the finals instead. Her band is disqualified when the Rainbooms reappear and defeat the Dazzlings. Despite being freed from the spell, Trixie still swears revenge for her defeat, while interrupting Twilight and Flash's romantic moment, and exits the stage after throwing a smoke bomb, falling off the stands during her getaway.
|-
|Twilight
|Female
|Pink
|White with a purple streak
|Purple
|Unknown
|Purple stars
|1983
|Rescue from Midnight Castle|Laura Dean
|1
|-
|style="border-bottom: 3px solid #6603AA;" colspan="14"|Twilight is shown to have a special ability to teleport by wishing herself. She also likes to gaze to the stars. In the UK comics, she was a mysterious little pony who would occasionally appear to grant wishes after dark surrounded by a strange mist. Twilight is the inspiration for the main protagonist of My Little Pony: Friendship is Magic, Twilight Sparkle.
|-
|Twinkleshine
|Female
|Pink (toy)White (animation)
|Dark pink (toy) Light pink (animation)
|Turquoise
|Unknown
|Three blue stars
|2010
|Friendship Is Magic|Nicole Oliver, Cathy Weseluck, and Tabitha St. Germain (S1E1)Andrea Libman (S2E25)
|4
|-
|style="border-bottom: 3px solid #6603AA;" colspan="14"|Twinkleshine is fairly commonly featured in the series as a background pony, appearing in over half the episodes in season 1. Her first and most prominent appearance is in Friendship is Magic, part 1, where she, Lemon Hearts and Minuette meet Twilight Sparkle in Canterlot while carrying presents on their backs. She informs Twilight about Moondancer's get-together and asks her to come along. When Twilight declines on the grounds that she has "a lot of studying to catch up on", Twinkleshine expresses her exasperation behind Twilight's back and chides her for showing more interest in books than friends. She next appears in the surprise party that Pinkie Pie throws for Twilight later in the episode, and has since then remained a regular sight in Ponyville. In The Ticket Master, she is one of the ponies crowding around Twilight in front of the library, and again in the alley that Twilight eventually teleports away from. A handful of frames show her starting to run after Twilight, but she is not part of the throng of background ponies in the chase scene that follows. During her two-second participation in the race, her mane style changes to one resembling that of Cherry Berry and Berry Punch.

In The Cutie Mark Chronicles, she appears in Fluttershy and Rainbow Dash's flashbacks of flight camp, standing on a cloud in the sidelines before the race starts, even though she is not a pegasus. However, as proved in Sonic Rainboom, there is a spell that enables non-pegasus ponies to walk on clouds, making the circumstances around Twinkleshine's station in Cutie Mark Chronicles much more plausible. In A Canterlot Wedding Part 1 and Part 2, she is one of Queen Chrysalis's first bridesmaids, along with Minuette and Lyra Heartstrings.

Her design in the animation resembles the G1 pony Moondancer. However her playful pony release gave her a different look, making her resemble the G2 pony Princess Twinkle Star. Twinkleshine's description in the toys says she wants to be a Movie Star.
|-
|Whistle Wishes
|Female
|Light blue
|Pink, yellow and green mane, pink and orange tail
|Green
|Unknown
|Rainbow stars and a cloud
|2006
|Crystal Princess: The Runaway Rainbow|Brittney Wilson
|3
|-
|style="border-bottom: 3px solid #6603AA;" colspan="14"|Whistle Wishes is one of Cheerilee's friends, who alongside Brights Brightly and Rarity, was in charge of bringing in the first rainbow of the season until Rarity disappeared.
|}

Alicorn ponies
Alicorn ponies with a pair of wings and a horn are rare in the franchise. They usually have the abilities of all three other kinds, the Earth, Unicorn and Pegasus ponies. They have appeared in the toy line since Generation Four, and may have been the spiritual successors to the Princess Ponies of Generation One. Dazzleglow made an appearance in My Little Pony Tales, but her toy form, a unicorn released before Tales as a part of the Glow 'n Show Ponies lineup, is unrelated to that of Tales. All four of the G4 Alicorn princesses are portrayed as being taller and more slender than most ponies, with unique horns and wings.

References

Sources
 

Further reading
 Summer Hayes (May 1, 2008) The My Little Pony G1 Collector's Inventory: an unofficial full color illustrated collector's price guide to the first generation of MLP including all US ponies, playsets and accessories released before 1997 with a foreword by Dream Valley's Kim Shriner. Priced Nostalgia Press. 
 Summer Hayes (2007) The My Little Pony G3 Collector's Inventory: an unofficial full color illustrated guide to the third generation of MLP including all ponies, playsets and accessories from 2003 to the present. Priced Nostalgia Press. 
 Hillary DePiano (2005) The My Little Pony Collector's Inventory: A Complete Checklist of All US Ponies, Playsets and Accessories from 1981 to 1992. Priced Nostalgia Press. 
 Summer Hayes (2009) The My Little Pony 2007-2008 Collector's Inventory. Priced Nostalgia Press
 Debra L. Birge (2007) My Little Pony*r Around the World. Schiffer Publishing. 
 Wood, Walton. "The Empirical Twilight: A Pony's Guide to Science & Anarchism" ImageTexT: Interdisciplinary Comics Studies. 6.1 (2011): n. pag. Dept of English, University of Florida. 18 December 2011. Web.
 Brandon T. Snider. (2013) My Little Pony: The Elements of Harmony: Friendship is Magic: The Official Guidebook''. LiBrown Books.

My Little Pony characters
My Little Pony Earth ponies
My Little Pony Earth ponies